Trichaeta vigorsi is a species of moth in the subfamily Arctiinae first described by Frederic Moore in 1859. It is found on Java.

References

Moths described in 1858
Arctiinae